F-box only protein 11 is a protein that in humans is encoded by the FBXO11 gene.

Function 

This gene encodes a member of the F-box protein family which is characterized by an approximately 40 amino acid motif, the F-box. The F-box proteins constitute one of the four subunits of ubiquitin protein ligase complex called SCFs (SKP1-cullin-F-box), which function in phosphorylation-dependent ubiquitination. The F-box proteins are divided into 3 classes: Fbws containing WD-40 domains, Fbls containing leucine-rich repeats, and Fbxs containing either different protein-protein interaction modules or no recognizable motifs. The protein encoded by this gene belongs to the Fbxs class. Alternatively spliced transcript variants encoding distinct isoforms have been identified for this gene.

FBXO11 is conserved from nematodes to mammals, and both human FBXO11 and its worm ortholog (DRE-1) form functional SCF ubiquitin ligase complexes. By binding to and mediating the degradation of its substrate proteins, FBXO11 plays important roles in regulating cell cycle regulation, tumorigenesis, and tumor cell metastasis. Well established targets of FBXO11 include BCL6, CDT2, and Snail.

Clinical significance 

Inactivation of FBXO11-mediated BCL6 degradation has been shown to contribute to abnormal germinal-center formation and tumorigenesis. The Caenorhabditis elegans DRE-1/FBXO11 was reported to target the conserved transcription factor BLMP-1 for proteasomal degradation, and thereby regulates developmental timing and maturation.  The gene encoding FBXO11 was found to be deleted or mutated in multiple diffuse large B cell lymphoma (DLBCL) cell lines, and this inactivation of FBXO11 contributes to increased levels BCL6 and subsequently DLBCL pathogenesis. FBXO11 mutations were also identified in other human cancers, such as colon, lung, ovary, and head and neck tumors. In mice, a homozygous mutation of FBXO11 results in cleft palate defects, facial clefting, and perinatal lethality. Moreover, haploinsufficient mutant alleles cause otitis media, a disorder that affects approximately 15% of children.

References

Further reading